Complement factor H-related protein 1 is a protein that in humans is encoded by the CFHR1 gene.

References

Further reading

External links
 
  GeneReviews/NCBI/NIH/UW entry on Atypical Hemolytic-Uremic Syndrome
  OMIM entries on Atypical Hemolytic-Uremic Syndrome